The 1986–87 season was Burnley's second season in the fourth tier of English football. They were managed by Brian Miller in the first season of his second spell in charge. 

This season was the worst-ever Burnley season, finishing 22nd at Fourth Division (near to be relegated to Football Conference, avoiding relegation by 1 point), and knocked-out in first round in both national cups (FA Cup and League Cup).

Appearances and goals

|}

Matches

Football League Division Four
Key

In Result column, Burnley's score shown first
H = Home match
A = Away match

pen. = Penalty kick
o.g. = Own goal

Results

Final league position

FA Cup

League Cup

Football League Trophy

References

Burnley F.C. seasons
Burnley